Bedabrata Barua (born 14 July 1928) is an Indian politician. He was elected to the Lok Sabha, the lower house of the Parliament of India, from the Kaliabor Constituency of Assam in 1967, 1971 and 1977 as a member of the Indian National Congress. He was a Union Deputy Minister of Law, Justice & Company Affairs.

References

External links
Official biographical sketch in Parliament of India website 

India MPs 1967–1970
India MPs 1971–1977
India MPs 1977–1979
1928 births
Living people
Lok Sabha members from Assam
Indian National Congress politicians from Assam